The deputy prime minister of Myanmar is the deputy head of government of Myanmar. The current Deputy Prime Ministers are Vice Senior General Soe Win, General Mya Tun Oo, Admiral Tin Aung San, Lieutenant General Soe Htut and Win Shein.

History of the office

The position of Prime Minister was created in 1948, with the adoption of the Burmese Declaration of Independence from the United Kingdom. Due to the country's long period of military rule, it has not been uncommon for the prime minister to be a serving (or recently retired) military officer. 

The position was abolished  according to the current Constitution (adopted in 2008). It provided that the president is both the head of state and head of government. 

On 1 August 2021, State Administration Council formed the caretaker government and vice chairman of SAC became Deputy Prime Minister.

Deputy prime ministers of Burma/Myanmar (1948–present) 

(Dates in italics indicate de facto continuation of office)

See also
 Myanmar
 Politics of Myanmar
 List of colonial governors of Burma
 President of Myanmar
 Prime Minister of Myanmar
 State Counsellor of Myanmar
 Vice President of Myanmar
 Lists of office-holders

Notes

References

Government ministers of Myanmar